Tonk is a city in the Indian state of Rajasthan. The city is situated 95 km (60 mi) by road south from Jaipur, near the right bank of the Banas River. It is the administrative headquarters of Tonk District. Tonk was also the capital of the eponymous princely state of British India from 1817 to 1947. Kamal Amrohi's movie Razia Sultan were shot in Tonk in 1981–82. Famous places in Tonk include: Shahi Jama Masjid, Bisalpur Dam, Arabic Persian Research Institute, Sunhari Kothi, Hathi Bhata, Annapurna Dungri Ganesh Temple, Rasiya Ki Tekri, Kidwai Park, Ghantaghar, Kamdhenu Circle, Nehru Garden, Chaturbhuj Talab Lake. It is also known as Rajasthan's Nawabo ka shahar.

Demographics

In the 2011 Indian census, Tonk had a population of 165,294, with 48% being female. 14% of the population is age six and under. Tonk has an average literacy rate of 68.62%: 77.68% in males, and 59.18% in females.religion in Tonk City Muslim 48% and Hindu 50% and jain 1.8% and 0.2% others.

History 
The founder of the state and its first ruler was Pindari Nawab  Muhammad Amir Khan (1769–1834), a leader of Pashtun descent from Afghanistan. In 1806, Khan conquered the area, taking it from a retreating regime Yashwant Rao Holkar. The British government captured it in turn. Khan then received the state of Tonk from the British Government who returned it. In 1817, after the Third Anglo-Maratha War, Amir Khan submitted to the British British East India Company and kept his territory of Tonk while receiving the title of Nawab. Tonk was founded one year later after Khan was granted land by the ruler of Indore.

A municipality was established at Tonk in 1885.

See also 
 Tonk (princely state)
 Wali Hasan Tonki

References

External links

Genealogy of the ruling chiefs of Tonk

Cities and towns in Tonk district